Thaumatocaryon is a genus of flowering plants belonging to the family Boraginaceae.

Its native range is Southeastern and Southern Brazil to Northeastern Argentina.

Species:

Thaumatocaryon dasyanthum 
Thaumatocaryon tetraquetrum

References

Boraginaceae
Boraginaceae genera